Qamışlı is a village in the Kalbajar District of Azerbaijan. It is situated along the Levçay river.

History 
Qamışlı was part of the Jevanshir Uyezd of Elisabethpol Governorate during the Russian Empire. According to 1886 census data, there were 22 homes and 183 Kurds of the Shiite branch of Islam in Qamışlı. According to the 1912 publication of the Caucasian Calendar, the village of Qamışlı was home to 121 people, the majority of whom were Azerbaijanis (classified as "Tatars" in the census).

Qamışlı was part of the village council of the same name in the Kalbajar District of the Azerbaijan SSR during the early Soviet period in 1933. The village had 58 farms and a total population of 320 people. The population of the village council, which also included the villages of Ağdaban, Bağırsaq, Bağırlı, Yanşaq, Susuzluq, and Zallar, was 100 percent Azerbaijani.

During the First Nagorno-Karabakh War, Qamışlı changed hands several times. The Armenian forces launched an offensive in 1993, capturing the entire Kalbajar district. A year later, during the Operation Kalbajar, Azerbaijani forces recaptured Qamışlı, but the Armenians soon launched a counter-offensive, forcing the Azerbaijanis to abandon the village. It was later incorporated into the breakaway Republic of Artsakh as part of its Shahumyan Province, where it was known as Yeghegnut. Qamışlı was returned to Azerbaijan on 25 November 2020 as part of the 2020 Nagorno-Karabakh ceasefire agreement.

Historical heritage sites 
Historical heritage sites in and around the village include the medieval bridge of Shahi, a khachkar and a stele from between the 12th and 13th centuries, as well as a 13th/14th-century chapel.

Demographics

Gallery

References

External links 

 

Populated places in Kalbajar District